The Romanian Greek Catholic Church or Romanian Church United with Rome, Greek-Catholic, sometimes called, in reference to its Byzantine Rite, the Romanian Byzantine Catholic Church is a sui iuris Eastern Catholic Church, in full union with the Catholic Church. It has the rank of a Major Archiepiscopal Church and it uses the Byzantine liturgical rite in the Romanian language. It is part of the Major Archiepiscopal Churches of the Catholic Church that are not distinguished with a patriarchal title.

Cardinal Lucian Mureșan, Archbishop of Făgăraș and Alba Iulia, has served as the head of the Romanian Greek-Catholic Church since 1994. On December 16, 2005, as the Romanian Church United with Rome, the Greek-Catholic church was elevated to the rank of a Major Archiepiscopal Church by Pope Benedict XVI, with Lucian Mureșan becoming its first major archbishop. Mureşan was eventually created a cardinal, at the consistory of February 18, 2012.

Besides the Archeparchy of Fǎgǎraș and Alba Iulia, there are five more Greek-Catholic eparchies in Romania (Eparchy of Oradea Mare, Eparchy of Cluj-Gherla, Eparchy of Lugoj, Eparchy of Maramureș, and Eparchy of Saint Basil the Great of Bucharest), as well as one eparchy overseas, the Romanian Catholic Eparchy of St George's in Canton, answering directly to the Major Archbishop and the Holy See, in the United States of America and Canada.

According to data published in the 2016 Annuario Pontificio, the Romanian Greek-Catholic Church had 504,280 members, 8 bishops, 1,225 parishes, some 835  diocesan priests and 235 seminarians of its own rite at the end of 2012. However, according to the 2011 Romanian government census, the number of its followers living in Romania was as low as 150,593, of which 124,563 are ethnic Romanians. The dispute over this figure is mentioned in the United States Department of State report on religious freedom in Romania. The vast majority of the Romanian diocesan priests in the Romania are married.

In addition, there are five other Catholic dioceses in Romania, belonging to the Latin Church, whose members are more numerous.

History

Following the Habsburg conquest of Transylvania in 1687, Metropolitan Atanasie Anghel entered into full communion with the See of Rome by the Act of Union of 1698, that was formalized by a synod of bishops on September 4, 1700.

By entering into the Union, Atanasie and the other bishops, along with their respective dioceses, accepted the supreme authority of the Pope, while at the same time being granted the right to keep their own Greek Byzantine liturgical rite. A diploma issued by the Emperor Leopold I declared that Transylvania's Romanian Orthodox Church is one with the Catholic Church and Holy See. Transylvanian Romanians were therefore encouraged to convert to Catholicism and join the newly created Greek-Catholic Church, while being able to retain the Byzantine rite, if at the same time they accepted four doctrinal points promulgated by the Council of Florence (1431 and 1445): the supreme authority of the Pope over the entire church; the existence of Purgatory; the Filioque clause; and the validity of the use of unleavened bread in the celebration of the Eucharist in the Latin Church (Eastern Orthodox had contended that Latin Catholic use of unleavened bread was erroneous).

The step undertaken by Metropolitan Atanasie Anghel and his Holy Synod obtained for the ethnic Romanians of Transylvania (then part of the Habsburg monarchy) equal rights with those of the other Transylvanian nations, which were part of the Unio Trium Nationum: the Hungarian nobility, the Transylvanian Saxons, and the Székely. This event coincided with the arrival of the Jesuits in Transylvania, who attempted to align this province more closely with Western Europe. However, most Romanians were not willing to convert, and this in turn led to the formation of Romanian Orthodox movements that advocated for freedom of worship for the entire Transylvanian population – most notable the movements led by Visarion Sarai, Nicolae Oprea Miclăuş, and Sofronie of Cioara, under the influence of the dominant Serbian Church.

In 1721, the Bishop's Residence was moved from Alba Iulia to Făgăraș, and eventually to Blaj (1737). Following this change, Blaj became a center of learning and national awakening for all Romanians..

In 1761, Petru Pavel Aron (1709–1764), the Bishop of Făgăraș and head of the Romanian Greek Catholic Church,  translated Biblia Vulgata into Romanian. While the Romanian Orthodox kept Church Slavonic as the official liturgical language till 1863, the Romanian Church United with Rome has been using the Romanian vernacular ever since its inception. In the 19th century, during a time when the Hungarian government was pursuing a Magyarization policy in Transylvania, the Romanian Greek-Catholic Church, with the aid of the Transylvanian School (Școala Ardeleană) and the Transylvanian Memorandum, played a prominent role in resisting ethnic assimilation attempts. Moreover, many leading figures of the Romanian emancipation movement in Transylvania, such as Simion Bărnuțiu and Iuliu Maniu, began their careers as lay servants of the Greek-Catholic Church.

Additional Greek-Catholic Eparchies were eventually set up at Oradea (1777), as well as Gherla and Lugoj (1853); Blaj, under the title of Eparchy of Alba Iulia and Făgăraș, became the Metropolitan (i.e. Archiepiscopal) See. On December 16, 2005, the Romanian Greek-Catholic Church was elevated to the rank of Major Archiepiscopal Church.

Persecution under Communism

After assuming political power in 1948, the Communist regime, rooted in Marxist–Leninist atheism,  deposed all 12 bishops of the Greek-Catholic Church on Stalin's orders. Moreover, on October 21, 1948, the 250th anniversary of the Romanian Greek Catholic Union with the Catholic Church, the regime arranged for the "voluntary" and "spontaneous" transfer of all members of the Greek-Catholic Church (decree 358/1948), that numbered some 1,500,000 at the time, to the Romanian Orthodox Church; furthermore, the property rights over many of the Greek-Catholic Church's possessions, including its four cathedrals, were transferred to the Romanian Orthodox Church, while the remainder of those properties were confiscated by the State.

The Greek-Catholic bishops, along with many of their priests, were accused by the newly installed Communist authorities of "antidemocratic activity". After refusing to give up their ties with the "reactionary" Holy See, they were imprisoned. At about the same time, the Orthodox Church was being "purged" of priests hostile to the Communist regime. Following this purge, the Orthodox hierarchy enjoyed good relations with the Communist authorities for the remainder of the Communist Rule of Romania.

Iuliu Hossu, Bishop of Cluj, turned down a proposal of the Romanian Orthodox Patriarch, Iustinian Marina, to convert to Orthodoxy and be named Orthodox Archbishop of Iaşi and metropolitan of Moldavia, and thereby become the official successor of the Romanian Orthodox Patriarch himself. Consequently, Hossu remained under house arrest. Year after year, he sent Memorandums to the President of the Republic, requesting that the country's laws and international agreements be observed with regard to the Romanian Greek-Catholic Church. In 1969, Pope Paul VI asked Hossu to accept an appointment to the cardinalate. As Hossu was reluctant to leave his people, the Pope created him a Cardinal only "in pectore", i.e. without publishing the fact, that was only revealed on March 5, 1973, three years after Bishop Hossu's death.

Another remarkable Romanian Greek-Catholic ecclesiastic of the time was Alexandru Todea (1912–2002). Secretly (in pectore) consecrated as a titular bishop on November 19, 1950, he was arrested and the following year he received a sentence of life in prison. He was granted amnesty in 1964. On March 14, 1990, after the fall of the Communist regime, he was appointed Archbishop of Făgăraș and Alba Iulia, and was created a Cardinal the following year.

After more than 40 years of clandestine existence, the Romanian Church United with Rome, Greek-Catholic re-emerged publicly, in the wake of the Romanian Revolution. Normative act 9/31, passed on December 31, 1989, repealed Decree 358/1948 (that outlawed the Greek-Catholic Church) as repugnant and bringing grave prejudice upon the Romanian State.

Only after much struggle and considerable delays, some of the Church's properties, in particular the cathedrals of Cluj, Blaj, Lugoj, and Oradea, were restored to their rightful owner. However, much of the original property remains in Romanian Orthodox or government hands, as the persecution started in 1948 has led to a marked reduction in the numbers of Romanian Greek Catholic faithful. After 40 years of Communist rule and forced assimilation into the regime-approved Orthodox Church, numerous Romanian cradle Greek-Catholics remained in the Romanian Orthodox Church, at least on paper, and it is unclear how many of these nominal Orthodox members remain crypto-Catholic, especially in northern Transylvania where most Greek Catholics lived (as shown on the maps to the right). Other Greek Catholic Romanians switched to the Latin Church, and now account for the second-largest group in that denomination after Hungarians. The Romanian Catholic Church United with Rome is still undergoing a process of recovery from the wounds inflicted by the Communist rulers and the forced merger.

Property issues since the fall of Communism
Since the fall of Communism, Church leaders have claimed that the Romanian Greek-Catholic Community is facing a cultural and religious wipe-out: the Greek-Catholic churches are allegedly being destroyed by representatives of the Romanian Orthodox Church, whose actions allegedly enjoy not only the acceptance, but also the support of the Romanian authorities.

Hierarchy
Ecclesiastical Province of Fagaras and Alba Iulia
 Romanian Catholic Archeparchy of Fagaraș and Alba Iulia
 Romanian Catholic Eparchy of Oradea Mare
 Romanian Catholic Eparchy of Cluj-Gherla
 Romanian Catholic Eparchy of Lugoj
 Romanian Catholic Eparchy of Maramureș
 Romanian Catholic Eparchy of Saint Basil the Great of Bucharest
Immediately subject to the Holy See
 Romanian Catholic Eparchy of St George's in Canton

See also
 History of Catholicism in Romania
 the Romanian Catholic Church

References

External links
 "Biserica Română Unită cu Roma, Greco-Catolică" (in Romanian)

 
Religious organizations established in 1701
Christian denominations established in the 18th century
18th-century Eastern Catholicism
1701 establishments in Europe